Jonathan Maher (born 1985) is an Irish hurler who played as a right corner-forward for the London senior hurling team.

Maher began his inter-county career after emigrating from Ireland when he linked up with the London senior hurling team. As an inter-county hurler he has won one Christy Ring Cup winners' medal and one Nicky Rackard Cup winners' medal.  

At club level Maher is a one-time county senior championship medalist with Kilburn Gaels. He previously played with Burgess.

References

1985 births
Living people
Burgess hurlers
Kilburn Gaels hurlers
London inter-county hurlers